K. Durai is an Indian politician and was a Member of the Legislative Assembly. He was elected to the Tamil Nadu legislative assembly as a Dravida Munnetra Kazhagam (DMK) candidate from the Thiruverumbur constituency in the 1996 election.

Durai left the DMK in April 2001. He had been denied a party nomination to contest the 2001 assembly elections amidst claims of impropriety, which he denied.

References 

Year of birth missing
Possibly living people
Dravida Munnetra Kazhagam politicians
Tamil Nadu MLAs 1996–2001